Puig is a Spanish fashion and fragrance company founded in 1914 by Antoni Puig i Castelló in Barcelona, Catalonia, Spain, and still managed by the Puig family.

Puig markets its products in 150 countries and is directly present in 26 of them, employing 4,472 people worldwide. In 2018, it had €2 billion in net revenues and €242 million in net income.

Both in the fashion and fragrances sector, Puig operates under the Nina Ricci, Carolina Herrera, and Paco Rabanne brands. In the fashion industry, it is also the majority shareholder of Jean Paul Gaultier and Dries Van Noten. In perfumes, it operates L'Artisan Parfumeur, Penhaligon's and under the license of the brands Christian Louboutin, Comme des Garçons, Adolfo Dominguez, Antonio Banderas, Shakira and Benetton. In cosmetics it operates through the French Uriage, majority-owned subsidiares, the British Charlotte Tilbury and the Greek  Apivita, and the Spanish joint-venture Isdin.

History 

The company's origins date back to 1914 when Antonio Puig Castelló founded the company. Initially the company took the name of its founder, being called Antonio Puig SA. From the beginning, the company oriented its business towards the cosmetic and fragrance sectors.

In 1922, the company marketed Milady, the first lipstick made in Spain.

In the 1940s the company started marketing the fragrance Agua Lavanda Puig, which became one of the flagship products of the company. During those same years, the founder Antonio Puig decided to move the factory and offices to a building located in Travessera de Gràcia street, in the Gràcia district in Barcelona, where the headquarters of the company remain until 2014.

In the following years, the four sons of the founder joined the company. Although the transition took place gradually, Antonio Puig eventually delegated its decision-making to his sons: Antonio and Mariano (died 2021) would focus on the perfume area, Jose Maria on the diversification department, and Enrique on the institutional relationships.

The international expansion of the company began in 1959 with the building of a new factory in the industrial estate Besòs, in Barcelona, and also with the creation of the first branch office outside Spain, in the United States. The US branch office was boosted by a letter written by a Spanish student in the University of Iowa, who lamented the impossibility of buying Agua Lavanda Puig in the US, as it was confirmed years later by company sources.

In 1968, Puig opened a branch office in Paris, at the same time that the company incorporated the Spanish designer brand Paco Rabanne. In 1969, as a result of this collaboration the fragrance Calandre began to be marketed. In 1976,  the company built a perfumery factory in Chartres, France. In 1987 Puig acquired Paco Rabanne's Fashion House.

One of the key milestones in the international expansion was the agreement reached in the 1980s with the Venezuelan designer Carolina Herrera in New York City to create and market all her fragrances. Years later, in 1995, Carolina Herrera fashion business area also joined Puig.

In 1997,  Puig reached an agreement with Antonio Banderas for the creation and subsequent commercialization of the brand  Antonio Banderas Fragrances. The following year the company acquired the brand Nina Ricci, keeping up with the policy of acquiring prestigious brands. In 1999 the Puig family refounded the company, renaming it "Puig Beauty & Fashion Group", but maintaining the same structure and the three business lines: fashion, fragrances, and cosmetics.

Puig acquired Spanish companies Perfumes Gal and Myrurgia. Also as the result of these procurements the brands Adolfo Dominguez, Massimo Dutti, and Heno de Pravia, among others, were assimilated into Puig.

In 2002, the Japanese fashion firm Comme des Garçons joined the company and only a year later it was the turn of the Italian Prada. Both companies became part of Puig’s catalogue of fragrances.

Marc Puig, member of the third generation of the family, became the General Director and eventually CEO in 2007, leaving Manuel Puig as vice president.

In 2008 the new management reached an agreement with the Colombian singer Shakira for the development of her fragrances.

In 2009 Puig Beauty & Fashion Group changed its trade name for the second time, becoming known simply as Puig.

The latest brands to be incorporated into the Puig structure are the ones from the Italian designer Valentino (in 2010) and French Jean Paul Gaultier. For this last one, Puig also became the majority shareholder, buying the 45% of the shares Jean Paul Gaultier Fashion House from the French group Hermès and 10% of Jean Paul Gaultier himself, who nevertheless retained the artistic direction of the brand that bears his name. During 2013, Puig moved its headquarters in France to the well known Champs-Élysées in Paris.In 2014, the company celebrated the centenary of its establishment with the inauguration of the new headquarters, located in Plaza de Europa of Hospitalet de Llobregat, called Torre Puig. This tower is a work of  architect Rafael Moneo, laureate of the Pritzker Architecture Prize, and GCA Arquitectos. The building was inaugurated by the Prince of Asturias. At the entrance of the building there is a statue from Joan Miró, ceded for 2 years by Fundació Joan Miró.

In January 2015, Puig acquired fragrance brands Penhaligons and L'Artisan Parfumeur.

During 2018, Puig acquired some niche brands, such as a majoritary shareholding of Dries Van Noten; boosting at the same time the development of  Penhaligon's and L'Artisan Perfumeur. Besides that, the company has also completed a majoritary shareholding of Eric Buterbaugh Los Ángeles, as well as reached an agreement with Christian Louboutin, in order to develop its beauty business.

Market share 
As of 2012, Puig has five production plants, four of them located in Europe and another in Mexico, producing 331 million units of perfume each year. With that production, in 2010 Puig reached a worldwide share of 7.6% of the fragrance business, whereas five years earlier its global share was 3.5%.

Puig commercializes its products in 150 countries and is directly present in 26 of them, employing 4,472 people worldwide. In 2018, turnover reached 1,933 million euros in net revenues and 242 million euros in net income.

Sailing sponsorships

The Puig family has always been strongly linked to the sailing world, especially in the figure of the late Enrique Puig, director of the company, president of the Salón Náutico and the Royal Barcelona Yacht Club. The company was the sponsor of the Copa del Rey de Vela from 1984 to 2006.

Puig was the shipowner and sponsor of the sailing boat "Azur de Puig". One of the usual crew of the sailboat was the Infanta Cristina, youngest daughter of King Juan Carlos I.

Since 2008, in collaboration with the Royal Barcelona Yacht Club, the company boosts and sponsors the "Puig Vela Clàssica" race, which is held in Barcelona waters in July every year. The main feature of this race is that it is reserved for traditional and classical boats only. This regatta is one of the main classical sailboats races of all those celebrated worldwide.

References

External links 

 

Puig
Design companies established in 1914
Cosmetics companies of Spain
Multinational companies headquartered in Spain
Fragrance companies
Chartres
Chemical companies established in 1914
Spanish brands
Spanish companies established in 1914